Bohutice is a municipality and village in Znojmo District in the South Moravian Region of the Czech Republic. It has about 700 inhabitants.

Geography
The western part of the municipality lies in the Bobrava Highlands and the eastern part in the Dyje–Svratka Valley.

History

The first written mention of Bohutice is from 1253, mentioning a parish church. At the beginning of the 14th century, the village belonged to the Vyšehrad Chapter, from which Jindřich of Lipá bought it. In the next centuries, lords of Lipá lent it to their vassals. In 1535, Jan of Lipá sold Bohutice to Jan Kusý of Mukoděly, and the village became centre of a small estate.

In 1545, the Anabaptists settled in the village with permission of its owners and remained here until their expulsion in 1622. After the Battle of White Mountain, the properties of the Kusý of Mukoděly family were confiscated. During the Thirty Years' War in 1619, the village was burned down entirely. After the war, Bohutice was donated to the Jesuits.

The Order of Jesuits was disbanded in 1773, and the Bohutice estate was acquired by Jan Topolanský. After his death in 1792, the widow Terezie married Jan Václav Petříček in 1808, after whose death in 1825 the estate passed through the marriage of his daughter Aloisie to the family of Josef Seydl. The last owner was Hans Seydl-Neuschel, whose property was confiscated after the end of World War II.

Economy
Bohutice is known for viticulture. It lies in the Znojemská wine sub-region. The first vineyard in Bohutice was founded in 1237. About  of vineyards are in the municipality. Mainly St. Laurent and Grüner Veltliner are grown here.

Bohutice is also known for apricot growing. A variety called "Bohutická apricot" or Abricot Surce de Bohutice was bred here.

Transport
The municipality lies on the railroad from Brno to Hrušovany nad Jevišovkou. However, the railway line of local importance from Brno main railway station terminates here.

Culture
The Summer Apricot Carnival is an annual event held in summer, which is based on the tradition of growing apricots. The event includes a competition for the best apricot jam and the best apricot spirit.

Bohutický košt ("Bohutice Tasting") is an annual exhibition of local wine production held in April.

Autumn Bohunice Festivities is a festival held in autumn. It includes music performances, craft demonstrations and consumption of local drinks and meals.

Sights

The most important monuments in the municipality are the Bohutice Castle and the Church of the Assumption of Our Lady. A fortress in Bohutice Castle was first documented in 1535. The Bohutice Castle comes from around 1600, when the old fortress was reconstructed into the Renaissance residence. Today the castle serves cultural, educational and social purposes, and also houses the municipal archive or a kindergarten.

In the castle, there is one of the greatest prides of Bohutice, an exhibition of 54 life-sized wooden statues depicting the Stations of the Cross connected to last Jesus Christ's way to the Golgotha hill. In the courtyard of the castle, there are four wine cellars.

In the western part of the village, there is the Lourdes grotto. The pilgrimage site was created by the plans of Pastor Antonín Prášek and was inaugurated on 22 July 1928. The pilgrimage tradition was banned in 1948 and renewed in 1990.

References

External links

Villages in Znojmo District